Ang Yong Guan (born 24 January 1955) is a Singaporean politician, psychiatrist and former colonel. He is the Progress Singapore Party Head of Training and 
Development since 2020.

Early life 
Ang graduated from the National University of Singapore in 1979 and had his postgraduate training in psychiatry at the University of Edinburgh between 1984 and 1986.

Political career 
Ang joined the Singapore Democratic Party as a candidate and contested in a four-member Holland–Bukit Timah GRC at the 2011 general election and was defeated by People's Action Party where his team obtained 39.92% of valid votes. Ang left the Singapore Democratic Party after he was defeated by the People's Action Party in the 2011 general election.

In 2014, he joined SingFirst  and contested in a five-member Tanjong Pagar GRC in 2015 general election and was defeated again by People's Action Party with only 22.29% of valid votes. 

Tan Jee Say, the party secretary-general dissolved SingFirst on 25 June 2020. At the 2020 general election, Ang joined as a candidate of the Progress Singapore Party  and stood in the newly created single-member constituency of Marymount SMC but was defeated by People's Action Party Gan Siow Huang with 44.96% of valid votes.

Military career
Ang had served in the Singapore Armed Forces (SAF) for 23 years, and was Chief Psychiatrist of the Psychological Medicine Branch before he retiring from the SAF in 2003 and attained the rank Colonel.

Personal life 
Ang is married to an educator and together they have four children. He runs a private clinic at the Paragon Shopping Mall.

Awards 
In 1995, Ang was awarded the Public Service Medal (PBM) for his grassroots contributions as a community leader at Kembangan Constituency, helping then-Member of Parliament George Yeo for more than 15 years. He was also awarded the Public Administration Medal in 1996 for his military services.

References

External links
 
 

Progress Singapore Party politicians
Singapore Democratic Party politicians
Singaporean politicians of Chinese descent
Singaporean colonels
Singaporean psychiatrists
National University of Singapore alumni
Alumni of the University of Edinburgh
1955 births
Living people
Singaporeans First politicians